Camptacra gracilis is a species of flowering plants in the family Asteraceae. It is native to northern Australia (Northern Territory, Queensland, Western Australia), and to the island of New Guinea.

Camptacra gracilis is an herb with divided leaves. Flower heads contain white ray florets and yellow disc florets.

References

Flora of Australia
Flora of New Guinea
Plants described in 1837
Astereae